The 2010 Magny-Cours Superbike World Championship round was the last round of the 2010 Superbike World Championship season. It took place on the weekend of October 1-3, 2010 at the Circuit de Nevers Magny-Cours.

Results

Superbike race 1 classification
Sylvain Guintoli was disqualified for ignoring a ride through penalty.

Superbike race 2 classification

Supersport race classification

References
 Superbike Race 1
 Superbike Race 2
 Supersport Race

Magny-Cours Round
Magny-Cours Superbike